Ken Flach and Todd Witsken were the defending champions, but lost in the second round this year.

Richard Krajicek and Jan Siemerink won the title, defeating Patrick McEnroe and Jonathan Stark 6–7, 6–4, 7–6 in the final.

Seeds

  Danie Visser /  Laurie Warder (second round)
  Ken Flach /  Rick Leach (second round)
  Patrick McEnroe /  Jonathan Stark (final)
  Grant Connell /  Patrick Galbraith (second round)
  John Fitzgerald /  Trevor Kronemann (second round)
  Tom Nijssen /  Cyril Suk (second round)
  Steve DeVries /  David Macpherson (quarterfinals)
  Wayne Ferreira /  Michael Stich (second round)
  Jacco Eltingh /  Paul Haarhuis (quarterfinals)
  David Adams /  Andrei Olhovskiy (third round)
  Sergio Casal /  Emilio Sánchez (third round)
  Mark Kratzmann /  Simon Youl (third round)
  Ken Flach /  Todd Witsken (second round)
  Gary Muller /  Javier Sánchez (second round)
  Shelby Cannon /  Scott Melville (second round)
  Marcos Ondruska /  Brad Pearce (second round)

Draw

Finals

Top half

Section 1

Section 2

Bottom half

Section 3

Section 4

References

 Main Draw

Men's Doubles